Collège Bart is a private college in Quebec City, Quebec, Canada. The school was founded in 1917 by Jean-Baptiste Bart, a teacher who emigrated from France. Bart's son Jean-Guy Bart became one of the leaders of the college. The current directors are Michel Bellerose and Johanne Renauld.

External links 

Colleges in Quebec
Educational institutions established in 1917
Private universities and colleges in Canada
1917 establishments in Quebec